Meydan-e San'at Metro Station is a station in Tehran Metro Line 7. It is located on the northern edge of San'at Square, in Shahrak-e Gharb area of Tehran. It is the current northwestern terminus of Line 7.

Building and Facilities

References

Tehran Metro stations